Jerry Lunn (born March 30, 1951) is an American politician. He has served as a Republican member for the 28th district in the Kansas House of Representatives since 2013. In 2016, the American Conservative Union gave him a 93% lifetime rating.

References

1951 births
Living people
Republican Party members of the Kansas House of Representatives
21st-century American politicians